Tarentola rudis is a species of geckos in the family Phyllodactylidae. The species is endemic to Cape Verde, where it occurs in the southern part of the island of Santiago and on the Ilhéu de Santa Maria. The species was described as a variety of Tarentola delalandii by George Albert Boulenger in 1906 based on several specimens collected by Leonardo Fea.

Taxonomy
The following former subspecies were elevated to species status in 2012: 
Tarentola rudis boavistensis: Tarentola boavistensis
Tarentola rudis maioensis: Tarentola maioensis
Tarentola rudis protogigas: Tarentola protogigas

The subspecies Tarentola rudis hartogi became a subspecies of Tarentola protogigas as Tarentolas protogigas hartogi.

References

rudis
Geckos of Africa
Endemic vertebrates of Cape Verde
Reptiles described in 1906
Fauna of Santiago, Cape Verde
Taxa named by George Albert Boulenger